29th Street is a 1991 American comedy-drama film written and directed by George Gallo and starring Danny Aiello, Anthony LaPaglia, and Lainie Kazan. It was adapted from a story by Frank Pesce and James Franciscus (who had both co-starred in the cult thriller Killer Fish).

Plot 
In 1976, Frank Pesce Jr. is a lucky man. His father, Frank Sr., is very unlucky. One day, Frank Jr. buys a lottery ticket and finds that he has a good chance of winning. But Frank Sr. has some gambling debts to the mob and they are willing to take Frank Jr.'s ticket. Frank must decide what to do with the ticket.

Cast 
 Danny Aiello as Frank Pesce Sr.
 Anthony LaPaglia as Frank Pesce Jr.
 Lainie Kazan as Mrs. Pesce
 Frank Pesce as Vito Pesce
 Robert Forster as Sgt. Tartaglia
 Ron Karabatsos as Philly the Nap
 Rick Aiello as Jimmy Vitello
 Vic Manni as Louie Tucci
 Paul Lazar as Needle Nose Nipton
 Pete Antico as Tony
 Donna Magnani as Madeline Pesce

Reception 
On Rotten Tomatoes 29th Street has an approval rating of 75% based on reviews from 12 critics.

References

External links 
 

1991 films
1990s biographical films
1991 comedy-drama films
American comedy-drama films
American biographical films
1990s English-language films
Films shot in North Carolina
Films directed by George Gallo
Films scored by William Olvis
Films set in 1976
1991 directorial debut films
1990s American films